The Bechdel test is a measure of the representation of women in film and other fiction. The test asks whether a work features at least two women who talk to each other about something other than a man. The requirement that the two women are named is sometimes added.

Passing or failing the test is not necessarily indicative of how well women are represented in any specific work. Rather, the test is used as an indicator for the active presence of women in the entire field of film and other fiction, and to call attention to gender inequality in fiction. Media industry studies indicate that films that pass the test perform better financially than those that do not.

The test is named after the American cartoonist Alison Bechdel, in whose 1985 comic strip Dykes to Watch Out For the test first appeared. Bechdel credited the idea to her friend Liz Wallace and the writings of Virginia Woolf. After the test became more widely discussed in the 2000s, a number of variants and tests inspired by it emerged.

History

Gender portrayal in popular fiction
In her 1929 essay A Room of One's Own, Virginia Woolf observed about the literature of her time what the Bechdel test would later highlight in more recent fiction:

In film, a study of gender portrayals in 855 of the most financially successful U.S. films from 1950 to 2006 showed that there were, on average, two male characters for each female character, a ratio that remained stable over time. Female characters were portrayed as being involved in sex twice as often as male characters, and their proportion of scenes with explicit sexual content increased over time. Violence increased over time in male and female characters alike.

According to a 2014 study by the Geena Davis Institute on Gender in Media, in 120 films made worldwide from 2010 to 2013, only 31% of named characters were female, and 23% of the films had a female protagonist or co-protagonist. 7% of directors were women. Another study looking at the 700 top‐grossing films from 2007 to 2014 found that only 30% of the speaking characters were female. In a 2016 analysis of screenplays of 2,005 commercially successful films, Hanah Anderson and Matt Daniels found that in 82% of the films, men had two of the top three speaking roles, while a woman had the most dialogue in only 22% of films.

In a study from 2022 that was published in the scientific journal Psychology of Popular Media, Bechdel test results of the 1200 most popular movies worldwide from 1980 to 2019 were presented. The authors used data from Bechdeltest.com and added 343 analyses for movies that were missing in this database. The authors found that less than half of the movies (49.6%) pass the Bechdel test. The analyses also showed that in the 2010s the share of popular movies passing was somewhat higher (63%) than in previous decades.

Criteria and variants

The rules now known as the Bechdel test first appeared in 1985, in Alison Bechdel's comic strip, Dykes to Watch Out For. In a strip titled "The Rule", two women, who resemble the future characters Mo and Ginger, discuss seeing a film and one woman explains that she only goes to a movie if it satisfies the following requirements:
 The movie has to have at least two women in it,
 who talk to each other,
 about something other than a man.

The other woman acknowledges that the idea is pretty strict, but good. Not finding any films that meet their requirements, they go home together. The context of the strip referred to alienation of queer women in film and entertainment, where the only possible way for a queer woman to imagine any of the characters in any film may also be queer was if they satisfied the requirements of the test.

The test has also been referred to as the "Bechdel–Wallace test" (which Bechdel herself prefers), the "Bechdel rule", "Bechdel's law", or the "Mo movie measure". Bechdel credited the idea for the test to a friend and karate training partner, Liz Wallace, whose name appears in the marquee of the strip. She later wrote that she was pretty certain that Wallace was inspired by Virginia Woolf's essay A Room of One's Own.

Several variants of the test have been proposed—for example, that the two women must be named characters, or that there must be at least a total of 60 seconds of conversation. The test has also attracted academic interest from a computational analysis approach. In June 2018, the term "Bechdel test" was added to the Oxford English Dictionary.

According to Neda Ulaby, the test resonates because "it articulates something often missing in popular culture: not the number of women we see on screen, but the depth of their stories, and the range of their concerns." Dean Spade and Craig Willse described the test as a "commentary on how media representations enforce harmful gender norms" by depicting women's relationships to men more than any other relationships, and women's lives as important only insofar as they relate to men.

Use in film and television industry
Originally meant as "a little lesbian joke in an alternative feminist newspaper", according to Bechdel, the test moved into mainstream criticism in the 2010s and has been described as "the standard by which feminist critics judge television, movies, books, and other media". In 2013, Internet culture website The Daily Dot described it as "almost a household phrase, common shorthand to capture whether a film is woman-friendly". The failure of major Hollywood productions to pass the test, such as Pacific Rim (2013), was addressed in-depth in the media.
In 2013, four Swedish cinemas and the Scandinavian cable television channel Viasat Film incorporated the Bechdel test into some of their ratings, a move supported by the Swedish Film Institute.

In 2014, the European cinema fund Eurimages incorporated the Bechdel test into its submission mechanism as part of an effort to collect information about gender equality in its projects. It requires "a Bechdel analysis of the script to be supplied by the script readers".

In 2018, screenwriting software developers began incorporating functions that allow writers to analyze their scripts for gender representation. Software with such functions includes Highland 2, WriterDuet and Final Draft 11.

Application
In addition to films, the Bechdel test has been applied to other media such as television series, video games and comics. In theater, British actor Beth Watson launched a "Bechdel Theatre" campaign in 2015 that aims to highlight test-passing plays.

In 2021, a TV provider from Israel called Partner TV endorsed the test in their platforms with a special mark added to the movies who pass the test.

Pass and fail proportions
The website bechdeltest.com is a user-edited database of some 6,500 films classified by whether they pass the test, with the added requirement that the women must be named characters. , it listed 58% of these films as passing all three of the test's requirements, 10% as failing one, 22% as failing two, and 10% as failing all three.

According to Mark Harris of Entertainment Weekly, if passing the test were mandatory, it would have jeopardized half of the 2009 Academy Award for Best Picture nominees. The news website Vocativ, when subjecting the top-grossing films of 2013 to the Bechdel test, concluded that roughly half of them passed (although some dubiously) and the other half failed.

Writer Charles Stross noted that about half of the films that do pass the test only do so because the women talk about marriage or babies. Works that fail the test include some that are mainly about or aimed at women, or which do feature prominent female characters. The television series Sex and the City highlights its own failure to pass the test by having one of the four female main characters ask: "How does it happen that four such smart women have nothing to talk about but boyfriends? It's like seventh grade with bank accounts!"

Films set in alternative or future worlds, such as fantasy and science fiction, are more likely to pass the Bechdel test. This may be because these genres are more likely to avoid traditional gender roles and stereotypes.

Financial aspects
Several analyses have indicated that passing the Bechdel test is associated with a film's financial success. Vocativs authors found that the films from 2013 that passed the test earned a total of $4.22 billion in the United States, while those that failed earned $2.66 billion in total, leading them to conclude that a way for Hollywood to make more money might be to "put more women onscreen." A 2014 study by FiveThirtyEight based on data from about 1,615 films released from 1990 to 2013 concluded that the median budget of films that passed the test was 35% lower than that of the others. It found that the films that passed the test had about a 37 percent higher return on investment (ROI) in the United States, and an equal ROI internationally, compared to films that did not pass the test.

In 2018, the Creative Artists Agency and Shift7 analyzed revenue and budget data from the 350 top-grossing films of 2014 to 2017 in the United States. They concluded that female-led films financially outperformed other films, and that those that passed the Bechdel test (60% of the films studied) significantly outperformed the others. They noted that of films since 2012 which took in more than one billion dollars in revenue, all passed the test.

A research study from 2022 showed that production budget was negatively associated with the probability of passing the Bechdel test across 1200 movies from 1980–2019. However, the observed increase of films passing across years was stronger for higher budget films. Increases of movies passing the Bechdel test over the years from 1980 to 2019 were also stronger for movies with higher revenues, and higher audience evaluations (IMDb ratings).

Explanations
Explanations that have been offered as to why many films fail the Bechdel test include the relative lack of gender diversity among scriptwriters and other movie professionals, also called the "celluloid ceiling": In 2012, one in six of the directors, writers, and producers behind the 100 most commercially successful movies in the United States was a woman.

Writing in the American conservative magazine National Review in 2017, film critic Kyle Smith suggested that the reason for the Bechdel test results was that "Hollywood movies are about people on the extremes of society — cops, criminals, superheroes — [which] tend to be men". Such films, according to Smith, were more often created by men because "women's movie ideas" were mostly about relationships and "aren't commercial enough for Hollywood studios". He considered the Bechdel test just as meaningless as a test asking whether a film contained cowboys. Smith's article provoked vigorous criticism. Alessandra Maldonado and Liz Bourke wrote that Smith was wrong to contend that female authors do not write books that generate "big movie ideas", citing J. K. Rowling, Margaret Atwood and Nnedi Okorafor among others as counter-examples.

Limitations 
The Bechdel test only indicates whether women are present in a work of fiction to a certain degree. A work may pass the test and still contain sexist content, and a work with prominent female characters may fail the test. A work may fail the test for reasons unrelated to gender bias, such as because its setting works against the inclusion of women (e.g., Umberto Eco's The Name of the Rose, set in a medieval monastery) or because it has few characters in general (e.g., Gravity, which has only two named characters). What counts as a character or as a conversation is not defined. For example, the Sir Mix-a-Lot song "Baby Got Back" has been described as passing the Bechdel test, because it begins with a valley girl saying to another "oh my god, Becky, look at her butt".

In an attempt at a quantitative analysis of works as to whether they pass the test, at least one researcher, Faith Lawrence, noted that the results depend on how rigorously the test is applied. For example, if a man is mentioned at any point in a conversation that also covers other topics, it is not clear whether this means that the conversation meets or fails the test. Another question is how one defines the start and end of a conversation.

Criticism
In response to its increasing ubiquity in film criticism, the Bechdel test has been criticized for not taking into account the quality of the works it tests ("bad" films may pass it, and "good" ones fail), or as a "nefarious plot to make all movies conform to feminist dogma". According to Andi Zeisler, this criticism indicates the problem that the test's utility "has been elevated way beyond the original intention. Where Bechdel and Wallace expressed it as simply a way to point out the rote, unthinkingly normative plotlines of mainstream film, these days passing it has somehow become synonymous with 'being feminist'. It was never meant to be a measure of feminism, but rather a cultural barometer." Zeisler noted that the false assumption that a work that passes the test is "feminist" might lead to creators "gaming the system" by adding just enough women characters and dialogue to pass the test, while continuing to deny women substantial representation outside of formulaic plots. Similarly, the critic Alyssa Rosenberg expressed concern that the Bechdel test could become another "fig leaf" for the entertainment industry, who could just "slap a few lines of dialogue onto a hundred-and-forty-minute compilation of CGI explosions" to pass off the result as feminist.

The Telegraph film critic Robbie Collin disapproved of the test as prizing "box-ticking and stat-hoarding over analysis and appreciation", and suggested that the underlying problem of the lack of well-drawn female characters in film ought to be a topic of discourse, rather than individual films failing or passing the Bechdel test. FiveThirtyEights writer Walt Hickey noted that the test does not measure whether any one film is a model of gender equality, and that passing it does not ensure the quality of writing, significance or depth of female roles—but, he wrote, "it's the best test on gender equity in film we have—and, perhaps more important ..., the only test we have data on".

Nina Power wrote that the test raises the questions of whether fiction has a duty to represent women (rather than to pursue whatever the creator's own agenda might be) and to be "realistic" in the representation of women. She also wrote that it remained to be determined how often real life passes the Bechdel test, and what the influence of fiction on that might be.

The Bechdel Test stirred a minor controversy in 2022 when writer Hanna Rosin evoked it in a tweet to criticize the gay romantic comedy Fire Island. Rosin's tweet was criticized for attempting to apply the test to a film about gay Asian men, a marginalized group, with some noting a film like Fire Island was not the type of film the Bechdel Test is designed to criticize. In response, Alison Bechdel said on Twitter that she added a "corollary" to the test according to which "two men talking to each other about the female protagonist of an Alice Munro story in a screenplay structured on a Jane Austen novel," i.e. the plot of Fire Island, passes the test.

Derived tests
The Bechdel test has inspired others, notably feminist and antiracist critics and fans, to formulate criteria for evaluating works of fiction, in part because of the Bechdel test's limitations. In interviews conducted by FiveThirtyEight, women in the film and television industry proposed many other tests that included more women, better stories, women behind the scenes, and more diversity.

Tests about gender and fiction

The "reverse Bechdel test" asks whether a work features men who talk to men about something other than a woman. A 2022 study that analyzed 341 popular films of the last 40 years showed that almost all (95%) passed the reverse Bechdel test, speaking to a much stronger representation of men than women.

The "Mako Mori test", formulated by Tumblr user "Chaila" and named after the only significant female character of the 2013 film Pacific Rim, asks whether a female character has a narrative arc that is not about supporting a man's story. Comic book writer Kelly Sue DeConnick proposed a "sexy lamp test": "If you can replace your female character with a sexy lamp and the story still basically works, maybe you need another draft."

The "Sphinx test" by the Sphinx theater company of London asks about the interaction of women with other characters, as well as how prominently female characters feature in the action, how proactive or reactive they are, and whether they are portrayed stereotypically. It was conceived to "encourage theatremakers to think about how to write more and better roles for women", in reaction to research indicating that 37% of theater roles were written for women .

Johanson analysis, developed by film critic MaryAnn Johanson, provides a method to evaluate the representation of women and girls in movies. Although developed for the screen, it can also be applied to books and other media. It consists of adding or subtracting points based on different categories of representation. The analysis evaluates media on criteria that include the basic representation of women, female agency, power and authority, the male gaze, and issues of gender and sexuality. Johanson's 2015 study compiled statistics for every film released in 2015, and all those nominated for Oscars in 2014 or 2015. She also drew conclusions about movie profitability when women are represented well.

Tests about other characteristics

LGBTQ+ people
The "Vito Russo test" created by the LGBT organization GLAAD tests for the representation of LGBT characters in films. It asks: Does the film contain a character that is identifiably LGBT, and is not solely or predominantly defined by their sexual orientation or gender identity, as well as tied into the plot in such a way that their removal would have a significant effect?

People of color
A test proposed by TV critic Eric Deggans asks whether a film that is not about race has at least two non-white characters in the main cast, and similarly, writer Nikesh Shukla proposed a test about whether "two ethnic minorities talk to each other for more than five minutes about something other than race." A 2017 speech by Riz Ahmed inspired the Riz test about the nature of Muslim representation in fiction, and Johanson analysis includes a rating of films on their representation of women of color.

The New York Times film critic Manohla Dargis suggested in January 2016 the "DuVernay test" (named for director Ava DuVernay), asking whether "African-Americans and other minorities have fully realized lives rather than serve as scenery in white stories." It aims to point out the lack of people of color in Hollywood movies, through a measure of their importance to a particular movie or the lack of a gratuitous link to white actors.

Nadia Latif and Leila Latif of The Guardian suggested in 2016 a series of five questions:
 Are there two named characters of color?
 Do they have dialogue?
 Are they not romantically involved with one another?
 Do they have any dialogue that isn't comforting or supporting a white character?
 Is one of them definitely not a magical negro?

For Bella Caledonia, poet Raman Mundair contrasted Sandra Oh's character in Killing Eve lacking any reference to her Korean heritage until she "has hit a complete emotional and psychological rock bottom" with the "authentic, true and engaging" Black characters in Michaela Coel's I May Destroy You in order to suggest a more-detailed test of "representation that exists outside the context of whiteness". Making reference to British East and Southeast Asian media advocacy group BEATS's 3-question test, In 2021, Mundair proposed that theatrical and broadcasting performances should represent people of color:

 rooted in communities, not just their own but how they code switch between and belonging in multiple spaces
 in functioning friendships, relationships and communities that mirror their heritage
 in the intersections of different worlds and experiences reflecting nuanced lived experience
 happiness is not dependent on white people
 being a fundamental part of the narrative with a functioning world outside of whiteness
 without a focus on race-based tragedy and trauma
 communities across class in a nuanced way, without stereotypes of gang membership, living on housing estates, running corner shops or being high-caste medical professionals
 with functioning visible or hidden disability without focus on tragedy or trauma
 queerness that doesn't focus on tragedy, trauma or hyper sexualisation
 women that doesn't exoticise, fetishize or involve any hyper sexualisation

In 2018, culture critic Clarkisha Kent created the "Kent Test", aimed at women of color. The Aila Test, created by Ali Nahdee on her Tumblr blog, tests representation of Indigenous women in media.

Orthodox Jews 
Following a controversy over misrepresentation of Orthodox Judaism in television, the nonprofit organization Jew in the City proposed the "Josephs test" for depictions of Orthodox Jews in fiction. The test includes four questions:
 Are there any Orthodox characters who are emotionally and psychologically stable?
 Are there characters who are Orthodox whose religious life is a characteristic but not a plot point or a problem?
 Can the Orthodox character find their Happily Ever After as a religious Jew?
 And if the main plot points are in conflict due to religious observance — are any characters not Hasidic or Haredi and have the writers actually researched authentic religious observance from practicing members of the community they are attempting to portray?

Tests about nonfiction
The Bechdel test has also inspired gender-related tests for nonfiction. Laurie Voss, at the time CTO of npm, proposed a Bechdel test for software: source code passes this test if it contains a function written by a woman developer which calls a function written by a different woman developer.  Press notice was attracted after the U.S. government agency 18F analyzed their own software according to this metric.

The Bechdel test also inspired the Finkbeiner test, a checklist to help journalists to avoid gender bias in articles about women in science, and Danielle Kranjec's "Kranjec test" of including sources written by someone who is not male on any source sheet in Torah study.

The Gray test, intended to improve citational practices, is named after and was created with the scholar Kishonna Gray. It requires that scholarly nonfiction texts cite the scholarship of "at least two [authors who identify as] women and two nonwhite [Black, Latino, or Indigenous] authors but also must mention it meaningfully in the body of the text." Like the Bechdel test, this was created as a "baseline test for establishing a bare minimum for responsible citation; it is not an aspirational test for best practices." It is being used by scholars and academic journals to vet articles.

See also

 
 
 
 
 
 
 Reverse harem – gender opposite of a "straight" harem

References

Further reading

External links

 Bechdel Test Movie List at bechdeltest.com (user-edited database)
 Bechdel Testing Comics blog at Tumblr (2011–2012)
 Bechdel Gamer blog (2012–2013)
 Women in Film, analysis tool for data from bechdeltest.com 

Feminism and the arts
Sexism
Tests
Media bias
Concepts in film theory
Depictions of women in film
Feminist theory